Antonello de Folgore (died 1590) was a Roman Catholic prelate who served as Bishop of Sant' Angelo de' Lombardi-Bisaccia (1585–1590).

Biography
On 27 November 1585, Antonello de Folgore was appointed during the papacy of Pope Sixtus V as Bishop of Sant' Angelo de' Lombardi-Bisaccia . On 13 December 1585, he was consecrated bishop by Giulio Antonio Santorio, Cardinal-Priest of San Bartolomeo all'Isola, with Giovanni Battista Pietralata, Bishop Emeritus of Sant' Angelo de' Lombardi-Bisaccia, and Andrea Canuto, Bishop of Oppido Mamertina, serving as co-consecrators. He served as Bishop of Sant' Angelo de' Lombardi-Bisaccia until his death in 1590.

References

External links and additional sources
 (for Chronology of Bishops) 
 (for Chronology of Bishops) 

16th-century Italian Roman Catholic bishops
Bishops appointed by Pope Sixtus V
1590 deaths
Archbishops of Sant'Angelo dei Lombardi-Conza-Nusco-Bisaccia